Pashmak-e Towq Tamish (also Romanized as Pashmak-e Ţowq Tamīsh and Pashmak-e Ţowq Tamesh; also known as Pashmak) is a village in Nezamabad Rural District, in the Central District of Azadshahr County, Golestan Province, Iran. At the 2006 census, its population was 477, in 104 families.

References 

Populated places in Azadshahr County